Kujang is a large village in Odisha, India. Kujang is also known as the gateway of Paradip industrial area. Literacy rate of Kujang is around 90.48%, higher than national average of 74.04%. In Kujang "Bana Bihari High School" is a major school for education which was started in 1901.

Geography
It is at  height to the sea level, is surrounded by blocks of Tirtol, Erasama, Mahakalpara, neighbouring District of Kendrapara. Kujang is also having approximate 5 km coast line to Bay of Bengal. The town is situated on the bank of the river Mahanadi.

History
The Kujang Estate was established by Mallik Sandha in 16th century with its capital at Kujang. They were excellent navigators Kujang became a rich estate, deriving great revenue from agriculture and sea trade. 
Due to the rebellious nature of the Kujang rajas and their continuous debt, the British government sold the estate in an auction in 1868 to the Queen of Bardhaman, whose rulers were loyal to the British.  However, the royal family of Kujang was still respected by the people of the estate.

Ratnamali Jema, an Indian freedom fighter and politician, was a princess of the dispossessed Kujang royal family. When the Bardoli Satyagraha was taking place in 1928, the peasants and tribals of zamindaris like Kujang were inspired to start campaigns against rent-hikes imposed by the British government. In the Salt Satyagraha of Odisha, Kujang became an important centre, in which Bhagyabati Devi of the Kujang royal family participated.
Narayana Beerabara Samanta is known as the "Gandhi of Kujang". He started the "Salt march" also known as "Labana Satyagraha" in Kujang, inspired by the Salt March carried out by the prominent Indian freedom fighter Mahatma Gandhi.
Kujang became a part of Jagatsinghpur district that was formed in 1993. Before that, it was part of the old Cuttack District.

Demographics

 Census of India, the village had a population of 3686. Of the total population, males constitute 1914 and females are 1772 with a sex ratio of 926 females per 1000 males. The population under 6 years of age are 367. The average literacy rate stands at 90.48% percent.

Transport

The nearest railway station from Kujang town is Badabandha Road railway station which is about 5 km from Kujang. There are frequent bus services available from Jagatsinghpur, Cuttack, Bhubaneswar, Kolkata and Puri. Kujang is about 70 km from Cuttack and 92 km from state capital Bhubaneswar.

Politics
Kujang comes under Paradip Assembly Constituency and Jagatsinghpur Lok Sabha constituency. Kujang is viewed as the political pond of Paradip Assembly Constituency. Mr Sambit Routray (Biju Janata Dal) is currently the MLA of Paradip. Dr Rajashree Mallik (Biju Janata Dal) is currently the Member of Parliament.Lokanath Choudhry was the past MLA of then constituency of Erasama a citizen of Kujang.

Cuisine
Once Kujang was famous for its cuisine such as chhena (cheese), Dahi (curd) and milk exporting and marketing. Many kinds of cuisines are made here like chhena poda, chhena gaja, Rasagola (Rasgulla).It also have a large market of dried fish.

Government
Whereas Kujang is a block, it consists Panchayat samiti Office, Block Office, Fishery Office, Forest Office, Revenue Office, Tahasil, Medical, Treasury, Fire station, Bank, College, and one police station. Three courts have been established in Kujang.

See also
Pankapal

References

Cities and towns in Jagatsinghpur district